Farkas from the kindred Bejc (died after 1269) was a Hungarian prelate in the 13th century, who served as Bishop of Győr from 1268 to 1269. Prior to that, he was provost of Székesfehérvár and vice-chancellor in the royal court, then briefly elected Bishop of Zagreb.

Biography
Also referred to as Wolfgang, his German name variant, Farkas originated from the gens (clan) Bejc (or Beuch), a minor Hungarian kindred, which possessed lands in Vas County around their centre, Bejc (present-day part of Bejcgyertyános), near the village of Rum. A large forest between Káld and Bejcgyertyános is still called "Farkas-erdő" (lit. Farkas' Forest) today, presumably named after the bishop. Through his brother Paul, he had a nephew Nicholas, who was granted the castle of Hricsó (present-day Hričovské Podhradie, Slovakia) by Béla IV of Hungary in 1265, courtesy to his uncle. The clan existed until the mid-14th century.

Farkas bore the title of "magister", demonstrating his potential education and skills in science. He was a staunch supporter of King Béla IV during his civil war against his son, Duke Stephen. He served as vice-chancellor and provost of the Székesfehérvár Chapter from 1262 to 1268. As a candidate of the monarch, he was elected Bishop of Zagreb by some members of the cathedral chapter in the second half of 1262, but the election was not confirmed by Pope Urban IV, because Béla's rival, the influential cardinal Stephen Báncsa suggested his namesake nephew at first, then the chamberlain of his household, Timothy to become the Bishop of Zagreb. Although Pope Urban IV instructed Farkas to visit the Roman Curia within four months in early 1264, however he was unable to take a journey possibly because of the emerging civil war between Béla IV and his son Duke Stephen. As a compensation of his unsuccessful candidacy in Zagreb previously, Pope Clement IV confirmed him as provost of Székesfehérvár on 4 July 1266. 

Farkas was unanimously elected Bishop of Győr around April 1268, as a result he was replaced as vice-chancellor and provost in that year. His election was confirmed by Pope Clement IV. After a short episcopacy, Farkas died in either 1269 or 1270.

References

Sources

 
 
 
 

13th-century Hungarian people
13th-century Roman Catholic bishops in Hungary
Bishops of Zagreb
Bishops of Győr
13th-century Roman Catholic bishops in Croatia